Oxalis oregana , known as redwood sorrel or Oregon oxalis, is a species of the wood sorrel family, Oxalidaceae, in the genus Oxalis native to moist Douglas-fir and coast redwood forests of western North America from southwestern British Columbia to Washington, Oregon, and California.

Description

Oxalis oregana is a short, herbaceous perennial with erect flowering stems 5–15 cm tall. The three leaflets are heart-shaped, 1–4.5 cm long with purplish undersides, on 5–20 cm stalks. The inflorescence is 2.4–4 cm in diameter, white to pink with five petals and sepals. The hairy five-chambered seed capsules are egg-shaped, 7–9 mm long; seeds are almond-shaped. It spreads by a scaly rhizome varying the size of patches they can be seen in throughout moist forest under canopies.

Rapid light response
Oxalis oregana photosynthesizes at relatively low levels of ambient sunlight (1/200th of full sunlight). When direct sunlight strikes the leaves they fold downwards; when shade returns, the leaves reopen. Taking only a few minutes, this movement is observable to the eye.

As food
The leaves of Oxalis oregana were eaten by the Cowlitz, Quileute and Quinault peoples. Like spinach, they contain mildly toxic oxalic acid, which is named after the genus. They are safe to eat in small amounts for those with no oxalate-related conditions.

References

oregana
Flora of the West Coast of the United States
Flora of California
Flora of Oregon
Flora of Washington (state)
Flora of British Columbia
Garden plants of North America
Flora of North America
Leaf vegetables
Flora without expected TNC conservation status